Suran may refer to:

Places
 Sawran, Aleppo Governorate, a town in Syria near Aleppo
 Suran, Hama Governorate, a town in Syria near Hama
 Suran, Ardabil, a village in Iran
 Suran, Isfahan, a village in Iran
 Suran-e Olya, a village in Kermanshah Province, Iran
 Suran-e Sofla, a village in Kermanshah Province, Iran
 Suran, Kohgiluyeh and Boyer-Ahmad, a village in Kohgiluyeh and Boyer-Ahmad Province, Iran
 Suran, Lorestan, a village in Lorestan Province, Iran
 Suran, Markazi, a village in Markazi Province, Iran
 Suran, Taybad, a village in Razavi Khorasan Province, Iran
 Suran, Torqabeh and Shandiz, a village in Razavi Khorasan Province, Iran
 Suran, Sistan and Baluchestan, a city in Iran

Other uses
 Suran (singer), a South Korean singer
 SURAN, the Survivable Radio Network project 
 Volkswagen Suran, a station wagon also called the SpaceFox
 Amorphophallus paeoniifolius or Elephant's foot yam, a tropical tuber

See also
 Suren (disambiguation)